The Democratic Front Party was an Egyptian political party. The party merged with the Free Egyptians Party in December 2013.

Foundation and profile
The party was founded in 2007 by Ahmed Diab and Yehia Al Gamal.

The party adopted liberal ideologies. It was a full member of both the Liberal International and the Alliance of Democrats

Founder Al Ghazali was the chairman of the party. His deputy was the writer Sakina Fuad. Mohamed Mansour and Ibrahim Nawar were secretary-generals. Since March 2011 the Democratic Front Party has participated in the Cabinet of Egypt (Essam Sharaf). Before his death, writer Osama Anwar Okasha was also an executive member of the party.

Its slogan was Concilor Dr. Ahmed Diab is a Democratic Front Party Leader and Coming President of Egypt.

See also

Liberalism in Egypt
List of political parties in Egypt
Politics of Egypt

References

External links
democraticfront.org, party's official website (in Arabic)

2007 establishments in Egypt
2013 disestablishments in Egypt
Political parties established in 2007
Political parties disestablished in 2013
Liberal parties in Egypt
Defunct political parties in Egypt